Peter James Meijer (born January 10, 1988) is an American politician and business analyst who served as the U.S. representative for  from 2021 to 2023. He is a member of the Republican Party.

Meijer is a member of the Meijer family, the founders and owners of the Meijer superstore chain. He was one of 10 House Republicans who voted to impeach Donald Trump during Trump's second impeachment. On August 2, 2022, Meijer lost the Republican primary for his seat to John Gibbs.

Early life and education
Meijer was born in Grand Rapids, Michigan. He is the oldest son of Hank Meijer and the grandson of Frederik Meijer, whose father, Hendrik Meijer, founded supermarket chain Meijer after he emigrated to the United States from the Netherlands. Forbes has recognized his family as one of the wealthiest in Michigan, with a net worth above $6 billion. His financial disclosures list more than $50 million in assets, primarily from a Meijer family trust.

During Meijer's childhood, his parents legally changed the spelling of his surname to 'Meyer', in an effort to shield him from any favoritism or criticism in his school years for being a member of the prominent Meijer family.  He legally readopted the family name at age eighteen.

Meijer graduated from East Grand Rapids High School in 2006. He initially studied for one year at the United States Military Academy at West Point before transferring to Columbia University in 2008, graduating with a bachelor's degree in cultural anthropology in 2012. At Columbia, he was an advocate for reinstating the Reserve Officers' Training Corps on campus. He was also a volunteer emergency medical technician for Columbia University's emergency medical services. From 2008 to 2016, Meijer served in the United States Army Reserve and was deployed to Iraq from 2010 into 2011, serving as an intelligence advisor.

In 2017, Meijer graduated from the New York University Stern School of Business with a Master of Business Administration. He is married to Gabriella Zacarias.

Career
From 2013 to 2015, Meijer worked as a conflict analyst for an international NGO. He was later employed by Olympia Development of Michigan of Ilitch Holdings as an analyst from April 2018 to January 2019. During this time, Meijer also worked on veterans projects such as Project Rubicon, was on the advisory board of the With Honor super political action committee, and assisted with urban renewal projects throughout Michigan.

U.S. House of Representatives

Elections
2020

Following Justin Amash's departure from the Republican Party in July 2019, Meijer announced his candidacy for Michigan's 3rd congressional district, competing in the Republican primary. He voiced his support for President Donald Trump, saying he would work with Trump to "make sure that we advance policies and an agenda that is in the best interest of West Michigan." In his primary campaign, Meijer received funding from several wealthy Michigan-based business families and outraised the other Republican candidates.

The DeVos and Van Andel families, who co-founded Amway, contributed to Meijer's campaign, though United States Secretary of Education Betsy DeVos and her husband Dick DeVos abstained from fundraising efforts. Mark J. Bissell of Bissell home-care products and the late businessman Peter Secchia also donated to Meijer's campaign. Vice President Mike Pence, Representative Dan Crenshaw, House Minority Leader Kevin McCarthy, House Minority Whip Steve Scalise, and Senator Tom Cotton endorsed Meijer. Meijer defeated Lynn Afendoulis in the August 4 primary election. Meijer faced Democratic nominee Hillary Scholten in the general election. He raised $2.7 million during the campaign, to Scholten's $3 million. The 3rd has historically tilted Republican; the district and its predecessors have been in GOP hands for all but 35 months since 1913 (it was numbered as the 5th before 1993). Nevertheless, the race was very close; Cook Political Report rated it a toss-up.

Ultimately, Meijer defeated Scholten, 53%–47%. It was the closest race in the district since Harold S. Sawyer was held to 53% in what was then the 5th district in 1982, and only the second time since 1982 that a Democrat had managed 40% of the vote (Amash's Democratic opponent had taken 43% two years earlier). He ran slightly ahead of Trump, who narrowly carried the district with 51% of the vote.

2022

Meijer ran for reelection in the district for the 2022 elections. His primary opponent was John Gibbs, a former Trump administration official. In the final days of the primary, the Democratic Congressional Campaign Committee bought TV ads designed to raise Gibbs' profile, believing that Meijer would be the more difficult opponent in the general election. Meijer lost the August 2 primary to Gibbs. Meijer said he would not support Gibbs in the November election. In November 2022, Gibbs lost the general election to Meijer's 2020 opponent, Hillary Scholten.

Tenure

Meijer accepted the 2020 presidential election results, announcing publicly that he accepted the outcome and recognized Joe Biden as president-elect. After experiencing the 2021 United States Capitol attack, he called on Republicans to take responsibility for their "lies" about election fraud. On January 13, 2021, he voted to impeach Donald Trump alongside nine other Republicans. The next day, Meijer stated in an interview with MSNBC that he had purchased body armor and made changes to his daily schedule due to threats against his life in reaction to his vote for impeachment. On January 20, 2021, the day of Biden's inauguration, Meijer was one of 17 newly elected House Republicans to sign a letter congratulating him and expressing hope of working across the partisan divide.

On May 23, 2021, Meijer condemned Representative Marjorie Taylor Greene's comparison between having to wear face masks in the House and the Holocaust. He was the first Republican to condemn Greene's remarks and said that "such comparisons demean the Holocaust and contaminate American political speech."

On August 24, 2021, Meijer and Representative Seth Moulton flew unannounced into Hamid Karzai International Airport during the 2021 Taliban offensive amid the evacuation of Americans and allies. The Defense Department and House Speaker Nancy Pelosi were not given advance notice.  The next day, Pelosi sent a letter to all House members saying that "the Departments of Defense and State have requested that Members not travel to Afghanistan and the region during this time of danger" because such travel "would unnecessarily divert needed resources" from the evacuation efforts.

Voting record
During the presidency of Joe Biden, Meijer had voted in line with the president's stated position 36% of the time.

On May 19, 2021, Meijer became one of 35 Republicans who joined all Democrats in voting to approve legislation to establish the January 6 commission meant to investigate the 2021 United States Capitol attack.

On October 21, 2021, Meijer was one of nine House Republicans to vote to hold Steve Bannon in contempt of Congress.

Foreign and defense policy
In June 2021, Meijer was one of 49 House Republicans to vote to repeal the Authorization for Use of Military Force Against Iraq Resolution of 2002.

In July 2021, Meijer voted for the bipartisan ALLIES Act, which would increase by 8,000 the number of special immigrant visas for Afghan allies of the U.S. military during its invasion of Afghanistan, while also reducing some application requirements that caused long application backlogs; the bill passed the House, 407–16.

In September 2021, Meijer was among 135 House Republicans to vote for the National Defense Authorization Act of 2022, which contains a provision that would require women to register for the draft.

Meijer voted for H.R. 7691, the Additional Ukraine Supplemental Appropriations Act, 2022, which would provide the Ukrainian government with $40 billion in emergency aid.

Energy and environment
Meijer has acknowledged the existence of anthropogenic climate change. He believes Republicans should take on the problem with conservative solutions. "Not only embracing conservatism and the Republican party's long history of conservation and environmental protection but extending that forward is frankly where the country is. I think that it is a political imperative and a moral imperative as well", he said.

On March 21, 2021, Meijer signed a letter pressing Biden to stop Enbridge Line 5, an oil pipeline, from being shut down in May. Congressional members' concerns about the pipeline's closure intensified after Biden revoked the Keystone XL Pipeline permit.

Meijer was one of eight House Republicans to vote for the Colorado Wilderness Act. The bill would designate 600,000 acres of public lands in the State of Colorado as components of the National Wilderness Preservation System.

in May 2022, Meijer was one of 16 House Republicans to vote for the Recovering America's Wildlife Act. The bill would provide states, territories, and tribes with $1.39 billion annually to catalyze efforts to restore habitats and implement conservation strategies, as described in each state's Wildlife Action Plan.

LGBT rights
In 2021, Meijer co-sponsored the Fairness for All Act, the Republican alternative to the Equality Act. The bill would prohibit discrimination on the basis of sex, sexual orientation, and gender identity, and protect the free exercise of religion.

In 2021, Meijer was one of 29 Republicans to vote to reauthorize the Violence Against Women Act. This bill expanded legal protections for transgender people, and contained provisions allowing transgender women to use women's shelters and serve time in prisons matching their gender identity.

Meijer was one of 31 Republicans to vote for the LGBTQ Business Equal Credit Enforcement and Investment Act.

In 2022, Meijer was one of six Republicans to vote for the Global Respect Act, which imposes sanctions on foreign persons responsible for violations of the internationally recognized human rights of lesbian, gay, bisexual, transgender, queer, and intersex (LGBTQI) people, and for other purposes.

On July 19, 2022, Meijer and 46 other Republican representatives voted for the Respect for Marriage Act, which would codify the right to same-sex marriage in federal law.

Immigration
Meijer was a co-sponsor of the America's CHILDREN Act. The bill would prevent the children of long-term visa holders who came to the U.S. legally with their parents from having their visas expire the day they turn 21. If they had maintained legal status in the U.S. for ten years and graduated from an institution of higher education, they were eligible to apply for permanent residency.

Gun policy
In 2022, Meijer was one of 14 House Republicans to support a bipartisan agreement on gun control, which included a red flag provision, support for state crisis intervention orders, funding for school safety resources, stronger background checks for buyers under 21, and penalties for straw purchases. On July 29, 2022, Meijer joined a majority of his Republican colleagues and five Democrats in voting against H.R. 1808, a bill to ban assault weapons.

Antitrust legislation
In 2022, Meijer was one of 39 Republicans to vote for the Merger Filing Fee Modernization Act of 2022, an antitrust package that would crack down on corporations for anti-competitive behavior.

Abortion
Meijer opposes abortion. He has consistently voted against bills to expand abortion access and has an A+ rating from the Susan B. Anthony list.

Committee assignments 
 Committee on Homeland Security
 Subcommittee on Intelligence and Counterterrorism
 Subcommittee on Oversight, Management, & Accountability (Ranking Member)
 Committee on Foreign Affairs
 Subcommittee on Europe, Energy, the Environment and Cyber
 Committee on Science, Space, and Technology
 Subcommittee on Energy
 Subcommittee on Space and Aeronautics

Caucus memberships
 Republican Governance Group
 Problem Solvers Caucus
 Republican Main Street Partnership

References

External links
 
 

|-

1988 births
21st-century American politicians
Activists from Michigan
American people of Dutch descent
American LGBT rights activists
Columbia College (New York) alumni
Living people
Meijer family
Military personnel from Michigan
New York University Stern School of Business alumni
People from Grand Rapids, Michigan
Politicians from Grand Rapids, Michigan
Republican Party members of the United States House of Representatives from Michigan
United States Army non-commissioned officers
United States Army reservists
United States Army personnel of the Iraq War